National Route 184 is a national highway of Japan connecting Izumo, Shimane and Onomichi, Hiroshima in Japan, with a total length of .

See also

References

184
Roads in Hiroshima Prefecture
Roads in Shimane Prefecture